Candice Lill (née Neethling; born 15 February 1992) is a South African cyclist who competes in the Cross-country and road bicycle racing disciplines of the sport. At the 2012 Summer Olympics, she competed in the Women's cross-country at Hadleigh Farm, finishing in 28th (last) place. Lill participated in the Elite Cross-country World Championships in 2018, 2019 and 2020.

Personal life
She is married to fellow South African cyclist, Darren Lill.

Major results

2009
 3rd  Cross-country, UCI Junior Mountain Bike & Trials World Championships
2012
 2nd Cross-country, National Mountain Bike Championships
2013
 2nd  Cross-country, African Under-23 Mountain Bike Championships
 National Mountain Bike Championships
2nd Under-23 cross-country
3rd Cross-country marathon
2014
 1st  Cross-country, African Under-23 Mountain Bike Championships
 3rd Cross-country, National Mountain Bike Championships
2015
 KZN Autumn Series
7th Hibiscus Cycle Classic
10th Freedom Day Classic
2019
 1st  Cross-country, National Mountain Bike Championships
 3rd  Cross-country, African Mountain Bike Championships
2021
 1st  Time trial, National Road Championships
2022
 3rd  Cross-country, Commonwealth Games

References

External links

1992 births
Living people
South African female cyclists
Olympic cyclists of South Africa
Cyclists at the 2012 Summer Olympics
South African mountain bikers
Cyclists at the 2020 Summer Olympics
People from Port Shepstone
20th-century South African women
21st-century South African women
Commonwealth Games bronze medallists for South Africa
Commonwealth Games medallists in cycling
Cyclists at the 2022 Commonwealth Games
Medallists at the 2022 Commonwealth Games